Raisin' Cain is an album by Johnny Winter, released in 1980 by Blue Sky Records. A retrospective album review for AllMusic by William Ruhlmann notes the mix of rock and roll, Chicago blues, and 
New Orleans rhythm and blues/New Orleans blues tunes lacks any compositions by Winter. Ruhlmann gave the album three out of five stars and concluded:

Track listing 
Side1
"The Crawl" (Raymond Victorica, Wayne Shuler)2:05
"Sittin' in the Jail House" (Robert Ross)3:19
"Like a Rolling Stone" (Bob Dylan)5:35
"New York, New York" (Rob Stoner)5:10
"Bon Ton Roulet" (Clarence Garlow)4:43

Side 2
"Rollin' and Tumblin'" (McKinley Morganfield)3:25                
"Talk Is Cheap" (Jim Liban)3:40
"Wolf in Sheep's Clothing" (Jon Paris)5:30
"Don't Hide Your Love" (Jon Paris)3:26
"Mother-in-Law Blues" (Don Robey)2:53
"Walkin' Slowly" (Earl "Connelly" King)3:19

Personnel 
Johnny Winterguitar, vocals
Jon Parisbass, guitar, harmonica 
Bobby Torellodrums 
Tom Strohmansaxophone 
Dan Hartmanpiano 
Dave Stilltambourine

References

1980 albums
Johnny Winter albums
Albums produced by Johnny Winter
Blue Sky Records albums